Richard de Clare, 2nd Earl of Pembroke (of the first creation), Lord of Leinster, Justiciar of Ireland (113020 April 1176), also known as Richard FitzGilbert, was an Anglo-Norman nobleman notable for his leading role in the Anglo-Norman invasion of Ireland. Like his father, Richard fitz Gilbert has since become commonly known by his nickname Strongbow (Norman French: Arc-Fort), which may be a mistranscription or mistranslation of "Striguil".

His son Gilbert de Striguil (or de Strigoil) died unmarried before 1189 and the earldom passed via Richard's daughter Isabel to her spouse William Marshall.

Cognomen (nickname)
Richard's nickname Strongbow has become the name he is best known by, but it is unlikely that he was called that during his lifetime. Nicknames of other Cambro-Norman and Norman lords were exclusively Norman-French as the nobility spoke French and, with few exceptions, official documents were written in Latin during this period. The confusion seems to have arisen when Richard's name was being translated into Latin. In the Domesday Exchequer annals between 1300 and 1304 (over 120 years after his death) it was written as "Ricardus cognomento Stranghose Comes Strugulliae (Richard known as Stranghose earl of Striguil)." This chronicler erroneously has attributed Stranghose (foreign leggings) as a nickname, where it is much more likely a variant spelling or mistranscription of Striguil, which is called Strangboge, Stranboue or Stranbohe in other transcriptions. It is in the fourteenth century that we have Richard's name finally rendered as Strongbow: "Earl Richard son of Gilbert Strongbow [earl of Shropshire]."

Career
Richard was the son of Gilbert de Clare, 1st Earl of Pembroke and Isabel de Beaumont, and he had a sister named Basilea de Clare. 

Richard's father died in about 1148, when he was roughly 18 years old, and Richard inherited the title 'count of Strigoil' Earl of Pembroke. It is probable that this title was not recognized at Henry II's coronation in 1154. As the son of the first 'earl', he succeeded to his father's estates in 1148, but was deprived of the title by King Henry II of England in 1154 for siding with King Stephen of England against Henry's mother, the Empress Matilda. Richard was, in fact, called by his contemporaries Count Striguil, for his marcher lordship of Striguil where he had a fortress at a place now called Chepstow, in Monmouthshire on the River Wye. He saw an opportunity to advance himself in 1167 when he met Diarmait Mac Murchada, the deposed King of Leinster.

Dispossession of the King of Leinster
In 1167, Diarmait Mac Murchada was deprived of the Kingdom of Leinster by the High King of Ireland – Ruaidrí Ua Conchobair. The grounds for the dispossession were that Mac Murchada had, in 1152, abducted Dervorgilla, the wife of the King of Breifne, Tiernan O'Rourke. 

To recover his kingdom, Mac Murchada solicited help from the King of England – Henry II. The deposed king embarked for Bristol from near Bannow on 1 August 1166. 

He met Henry in Aquitaine in the Autumn of 1166. Henry could not help him at this time, but provided a letter of comfort for willing supporters of Mac Murchada's cause in his kingdom. However, after his return to Wales, he failed to rally any forces to his standard. He eventually met the count of Striguil (nicknamed "Strongbow") and other barons of the Welsh Marches. Mac Murchada came to an agreement with Richard de Clare: for the earl's assistance with an army the following spring, he could have Aoife, Mac Murchada's eldest daughter in marriage and the succession to Leinster. 

As Henry's approval to Mac Murchada was a general one, the count of Striguil thought it prudent to obtain Henry's specific consent to travel to Ireland: he waited two years to do this. Although no formal permission was granted, Strongbow raised the issue at court in 1168 and was not refused. On 23 August 1170, however, when he embarked on his ships at Milford Haven, a royal messenger arrived to forbid the enterprise. Strongbow set sail in defiance of Henry II.

The re-taking of Leinster

Mac Murchada and Richard de Clare raised a large army, which included Welsh archers and arranged for Raymond FitzGerald (also known as Raymond le Gros) to lead it. The force took the Ostman towns of Wexford, Waterford, and Dublin in rapid succession between 1169 and 1170. Richard de Clare, however, was not with the first invading party and arrived later, in August 1170.

In May 1171, Diarmait Mac Murchada died and his son, Donal MacMurrough-Kavanagh, claimed the kingdom of Leinster in accordance with his rights under the Brehon Laws. Richard de Clare also claimed the kingship in the right of his wife. At this time, Strongbow sent his uncle, Hervey de Montmorency, on an embassy to Henry II. This was necessary to appease the King who was growing restive at the count's increasing power. Upon his return, de Montmorency conveyed the King's terms – the return of Richard de Clare's lands in France, England, and Wales as well as leaving him in possession of his Irish lands. In return, Richard de Clare surrendered Dublin, Waterford, and other fortresses to the English king. Henry's intervention was successful and both the Gaelic and Norman lords in the south and east of Ireland accepted his rule; Richard de Clare also agreed to assist Henry II in his coming war in France.

Henry crossed over to Ireland in October 1172 and stayed in Ireland for six months. He put his own men into nearly all the important places, Richard keeping only Kildare. In 1173 Richard went in person to France to help Henry II during the rebellion of his sons, being reinstated in Leinster as a reward. In 1174 he advanced into Munster and was severely defeated, but subsequently Raymond FitzGerald re-established his supremacy in Leinster.

Marriage and issue

By an unknown mistress, Richard de Clare fathered two daughters:
 Aline de Clare, who married William FitzMaurice FitzGerald, baron of Naas
 Basilia de Clare, who married Robert de Quincy, Constable of Leinster

On about 26 August 1171 in Reginald's Tower, Waterford, Richard de Clare married MacMurrough's daughter, Aoife MacMurrough (anglicised as "Eva"). Their children were:
 Gilbert de Clare, 3rd Earl of Pembroke, a minor who died in 1185
 Isabel de Clare, 4th Countess of Pembroke, who became Countess of Pembroke in her own right in 1185 (on the death of her brother) until her own death in 1220.
King Henry II had promised Sir William Marshal that he would be given Isabel as his bride, and his son Richard I upheld the promise one month after his ascension to the throne. The earldom was given to her husband as her consort. Marshall was the son of John the Marshal, by Sibylle, the sister of Patrick, Earl of Salisbury.

Richard de Clare died in June 1176 of some type of infection in his leg or foot. He was buried in Holy Trinity Church in Dublin with his uncle-in-law, Lawrence, Archbishop of Dublin, presiding. King Henry II took all of Strongbow's lands and castles for himself and placed a royal official in charge of them. He protected the inheritance of Isabel. Eva was given her dower rights and possibly held Striguil [Chepstow] as part of those dower rights until the Welsh rebellion of 1184/85. There is a record of Eva confirming a charter in Ireland in 1188/89 as "comtissa de Hibernia".

Legacy
Richard de Clare was first interred in Dublin's Christ Church Cathedral where an alleged effigy can be viewed. Richard de Clare's actual tomb-effigy was destroyed when the roof of the Cathedral collapsed in 1562. The one on display dates from around the 15th century and bears the coat of arms of an unknown knight, and is the effigy of another local knight. Richard de Clare was buried in Christ Church Cathedral, Dublin within sight of the cross according to an eyewitness, Giraldus Cambrensis. There is little evidence to support the tradition that he was buried either in St Edan's Cathedral, Ferns, Christ Church Cathedral, Waterford or Dominican priory, Kilkenny. References to 'de Clare' being buried in Gloucester cathedral refer to his father, while those to 'Strongbow' in Tintern abbey refer probably to Walter or Anselm Marshall, both of whom died in 1245.

In popular culture
The English cider brand Strongbow is named after him.

See also
 Dáibhí Ó Cróinín, Early Medieval Ireland 400–1200 (London; New York: Longman Press, 1995) pp. 6, 281, 287, 289
 The Song of Dermot and the Earl
 De Lacy
 Kilkenny Castle

Notes

References

Sources

Citations

External links

1130 births
1176 deaths
Normans in Ireland
Anglo-Normans in Wales
Richard de Clare
People from Tonbridge
Richard
People from Pembrokeshire
Earls of Buckingham
Lords Lieutenant of Ireland